Kudutl is a rural locality (a selo) in Gergebilsky District, Republic of Dagestan, Russia. The population was 541 as of 2010. There are 11 streets.

Geography 
Kurmi is located 22 km northwest of Gergebil (the district's administrative centre) by road. Maydanskoye and Arakani are the nearest rural localities.

References 

Rural localities in Gergebilsky District